Peter Goodwin is a British academic who is chairman of the department of Journalism and Mass Communication at the University of Westminster.

Work 
He is the author of Television under the Tories: Broadcasting Policy 1979 - 1997.

His areas of expertise are political economy of the media; media policy; media and politics; the television industry; and the social and economic impact of new media technologies.

He is cited by Brunel University in London, describing himself as "an international expert in digital media policy and economics".

References 

Year of birth missing (living people)
Living people
Place of birth missing (living people)
Academics of the University of Westminster